Barilius ardens is a fish in genus Barilius of the family Cyprinidae. It is found in Sita and Swarna River systems in the Western Ghats of India.

References 

Barilius
Fish of India
Fish described in 2015